The San Diego State Aztecs are the athletic teams that represent San Diego State University (SDSU). San Diego State currently sponsors six men's and eleven women's sports at the varsity level.

The Aztecs compete in NCAA Division I (FBS for football). The program's primary conference is the Mountain West Conference, though the men's soccer team competes in the Pac-12 Conference, women's water polo competes in the Golden Coast Conference, and women's lacrosse competes as an independent. On May 31, 2022, it was announced that women's lacrosse had received and accepted an invitation to join the Pac-12 Conference no later than the 2024 season (2023–24 school year).

News reports (especially on local radio) often mention "Montezuma Mesa" or "news from the mesa" when discussing San Diego State-related sports events. The San Diego State campus is known as "Montezuma Mesa", as the university is situated on a mesa overlooking Mission Valley and is located at the intersection of Montezuma Road and College Avenue in the city of San Diego.

Sports sponsored

Men's varsity sports

Baseball

 Head Coach: Mark Martinez
 Stadium: Tony Gwynn Stadium
 Conference regular season championships: 5 (1986 • 1988 • 1990 • 2002 • 2004)
 Conference tournament championships: 8 (1990 • 1991 • 2000 • 2013 • 2014 • 2015 • 2017 • 2018)
 NCAA Division I Baseball Championship appearances: 14 (1979 • 1981 • 1982 • 1983 • 1984 • 1986 • 1990 • 1991 • 2009 • 2013 • 2014 • 2015 • 2017 • 2018)

See: San Diego State baseball and College baseball

Basketball

	

 Head Coach: Brian Dutcher
 Arena: Viejas Arena
 Conference regular season championships: 23 (1923 • 1925 • 1932 • 1934 • 1937 • 1939 • 1941 • 1942 • 1954 • 1957 • 1958 • 1967 • 1968 • 1977 • 1978 • 2006 • 2011 • 2012 • 2014 • 2015 • 2016 • 2020 • 2021)
 Conference tournament championships: 8 (1976 • 1985 • 2002 • 2006 • 2010 • 2011 • 2018 • 2021)
 NCAA Division I men's basketball tournament appearances: 14 (1975 • 1976 • 1985 • 2002 • 2006 • 2010 • 2011 • 2012 • 2013 • 2014 • 2015 • 2018 • 2021 • 2022)

Aztec basketball alumni who became more famous outside the sport include 1930s player Art Linkletter, who went on to an illustrious entertainment career that spanned more than 70 years, and Tony Gwynn, who also played baseball at San Diego State and opted for that sport professionally, ending up in the Baseball Hall of Fame.

In the 2010–2011 season, the men's team had a record of 32–2 to capture a share of the Mountain West Conference title. They won the conference tournament outright for the automatic berth to the 2011 NCAA Division I men's basketball tournament. The only losses of the regular season were to another top 10 ranked team, BYU, who the Aztecs later beat to win the conference tournament. They earned a 2nd seed in the NCAA tournament, advancing to the Sweet 16. In the 2013–2014 season, the Aztecs finished 29–4, again reaching the NCAA tournament's Sweet 16 round.

Football

 Head Coach: Brady Hoke
 Stadium: Snapdragon Stadium

 Conference championships: 19 (1922 • 1923 • 1924 • 1936 • 1937 • 1950 • 1951 • 1962 • 1966 • 1967 • 1969 • 1970 • 1972 • 1973 • 1974 • 1986 • 2012 • 2015 • 2016)
 NCAA postseason bowl game appearances: 20 (1948 Harbor Bowl • 1952 Pineapple Bowl • 1966 Camellia Bowl • 1967 Camellia Bowl • 1969 Pasadena Bowl • 1986 Holiday Bowl • 1991 Freedom Bowl • 1998 Las Vegas Bowl • 2010 Poinsettia Bowl • 2011 New Orleans Bowl • 2012 Poinsettia Bowl • 2013 Famous Idaho Potato Bowl • 2014 Poinsettia Bowl • 2015 Hawaii Bowl • 2016 Las Vegas Bowl • 2017 Armed Forces Bowl • 2018 Frisco Bowl • 2019 New Mexico Bowl • 2021 Frisco Bowl • 2022 Hawaii Bowl)

San Diego State University's football team is part of the highest level of American collegiate football, the Football Bowl Subdivision of Division I (which was formerly known as Division I-A). SDSU is 10–9 all time in post-season bowl games. They first went to a bowl game in 1948 and first won a major-college bowl game in 1969. Until the 2010 season, the Aztec football team had not won a bowl game in the past 37 years. In 2019, the Aztecs reached their 10th straight bowl game.

The Aztecs moved into the new Snapdragon Stadium, located in what had been the parking lot of the team's former home of San Diego Stadium, for the 2022 season. During the construction of Snapdragon Stadium, the Aztecs played the 2020 and 2021 seasons at Dignity Health Sports Park in Carson, California. The team had played at San Diego Stadium from its opening in 1967 until its closure after the 2019 season; before that, it played in the on-campus Aztec Bowl (now the location of Viejas Arena).

Golf 

 Head Coach: Ryan Donovan
Mountain West Conference championships: 3 (2011 • 2012 • 2015)
 NCAA Division I Men's Golf Championships appearances: 23 (1960 • 1962 • 1965 • 1966 • 1967 • 1970 • 1976 • 1977 • 1978 • 1979 • 1980 • 1981 • 1982 • 1983 • 1984 • 1999 • 2003 • 2005 • 2008 • 2011 • 2012 • 2015 • 2016)

The Aztecs men's golf team has more NCAA postseason appearances than any other San Diego State athletic team. Notable alumni include 2015 graduate and PGA Tour golfer Xander Schauffele. In 2017, Schauffele received the 2017 PGA Tour Rookie of the Year award.

Soccer 

 Head Coach: Ryan Hopkins
 Home field: SDSU Sports Deck
 NCAA Division I Men's Soccer Championship appearances: 8 (1969 • 1982 • 1987 • 1988 • 1989 • 2005 • 2006 • 2016)

The San Diego State men's soccer team competes in the Pac-12 Conference. In 1987, the Aztecs reached the NCAA Men's Soccer Championship Final, losing in the game by a score of 0–2 to Clemson. The team has an overall NCAA Division Tournament record of 5–8 through eight appearances. Lev Kirshner was head coach for over two decades.

Tennis 

 Head Coach: Gene Carswell
Home court: Aztec Tennis Center
Mountain West Conference regular season championships: 6 (2002 • 2003 • 2005 • 2006 • 2007 • 2013)
Mountain West Conference tournament championships: 3 (2002 • 2003 • 2005)
 NCAA Division I Men's Tennis Championship tournament appearances: 7 (1998 • 1999 • 2000 • 2002 • 2003 • 2005 • 2015)

Women's varsity sports

Basketball 

 Head Coach: Stacie Terry-Hutson
 Arena: Viejas Arena
 Conference regular season championships: 6 (1994 • 1995 • 1997 • 2009 • 2012 • 2013)
 Conference tournament championships: 4 (1994 • 1997 • 2010 • 2012)
NCAA Division I women's basketball tournament appearances: 9 (1984 • 1985 • 1993 • 1994 • 1995 • 1997 • 2009 • 2010 • 2012)

Cross Country 

 Head Coach: Shelia Burrell
 Home field: Morley Field
 NCAA Women's Division I Cross Country Championship appearances: 1 (1981)

The San Diego State Aztecs women's cross country team has appeared in the NCAA tournament one time, with that appearance resulting in 7th place in the 1981–82 school year.

Golf 

 Head Coach: Lauren Dobashi
Mountain West Conference championships: 2 (2015 • 2019)

Notable alumni include 2015 graduate Paige Spiranac.

Lacrosse 

 Head Coach: Kylee White
 Home field: Aztec Lacrosse Field
Conference championships: 2 (MPSF) (2018 • 2019)

The women's lacrosse team began play in 2012 and competes as an independent; its former women's lacrosse home of the Mountain Pacific Sports Federation dropped the sport after the 2019–20 school year due to a lack of competing members. After the 2023 season, SDSU women's lacrosse will join the Pac-12 Conference.

Soccer 

 Head Coach: Mike Friesen
 Home field: SDSU Sports Deck
Mountain West Conference regular season championships: 6 (1999 • 2012 • 2013 • 2014 • 2015 • 2019)
Mountain West Conference tournament championships: 5 (2009 • 2012 • 2013 • 2014 • 2017)
 NCAA Division I Women's Soccer Championship appearances: 7 (1998 • 1999 • 2009 • 2012 • 2013 • 2014 • 2017)

The Aztecs women's soccer team have an NCAA Division I Tournament record of 4–7 through seven appearances.

Softball 

 Head Coach: Stacey Nuveman Deniz
 Stadium: SDSU Softball Stadium
Mountain West Conference championships: 8 (2001 • 2002 • 2003 • 2006 • 2008 • 2012 • 2013 • 2014)
 NCAA Division I softball tournament appearances: 11 (2001 • 2003 • 2006 • 2008 • 2009 • 2010 • 2011 • 2012 • 2013 • 2014 • 2015)

Swimming & Diving 

 Head Coach: Mike Schrader
 Home pool: Aztec Aquaplex
Mountain West Conference regular season championships: 1 (2011)
Mountain West Conference tournament championships: 4 (2011 • 2013 • 2015 • 2019)
 NCAA Division I Women's Swimming and Diving Championships appearances: 8 (1982 • 2010 • 2012 • 2013 • 2014 • 2015 • 2017 • 2019)

Tennis 

 Head Coach: Peter Mattera
 Home court: Aztec Tennis Center
Mountain West Conference regular season championships: 3 (2002 • 2003 • 2013)
Mountain West Conference tournament championships: 1 (2003)
 NCAA Division I Women's Tennis Championship appearances: 22 (1982 • 1983 • 1984 • 1985 • 1986 • 1989 • 1990 • 1991 • 1992 • 1993 • 1996 • 1997 • 1998 • 1999 • 2000 • 2002 • 2003 • 2005 • 2006 • 2007 • 2009 • 2013)

Track & Field (Indoor and Outdoor) 

 Head Coach: Shelia Burrell
 Home track: Aztrack at SDSU Sports Deck
Mountain West Conference indoor championships: 1 (2013)
Mountain West Conference outdoor championships: 5 (2003 • 2013 • 2014 • 2017 • 2018)
 NCAA Women's Division I Indoor Track and Field Championships appearances: 10 (2006 • 2008 • 2009 • 2010 • 2012 • 2013 • 2014 • 2017 • 2018 • 2019)
 NCAA Women's Division I Outdoor Track and Field Championships appearances: 22 (1982 • 1983 • 1984 • 1985 • 1986 • 1998 • 1999 • 2001 • 2003 • 2004 • 2005 • 2007 • 2008 • 2009 • 2011 • 2012 • 2013 • 2014 • 2016 • 2017 • 2018 • 2019)

Volleyball 

 Head Coach: Brent Hilliard
 Home arena: Aztec Court at Peterson Gymnasium
Mountain West Conference regular season championships: 1 (2012)
 NCAA Division I women's volleyball tournament appearances: 14 (1981 • 1982 • 1983 • 1984 • 1985 • 1986 • 1988 • 1989 • 1990 • 1994 • 1995 • 1996 • 2001 • 2012)

The Aztecs women's volleyball team have an NCAA Division I Tournament record of 13–14 through fourteen appearances.

Water Polo 

 Head Coach: Carin Crawford
 Home pool: Aztec Aquaplex
 NCAA Women's Water Polo Championship appearances: 3 (2007 • 2008 • 2016)

Conference affiliations
San Diego State has been a member of six different athletic conferences in its history.

 Southern California Junior College Conference (1921–1924)
 Southern California Intercollegiate Athletic Conference (1926–1938)
 California Collegiate Athletic Association (1939–1967)
 Pacific Coast Athletic Association (1969–1975)
Independent (1925, 1968, 1976–1977)
 Western Athletic Conference (1978–1998)
 Mountain West Conference (1999–present)

Discontinued sports 

In the past, San Diego State, like most American universities, has sponsored several additional varsity sports programs to those currently offered. These programs have since been discontinued. Budgeting and Title IX equity challenges have been cited as the primary reasons for these programs being cut. In some cases (notably men's crew and men's volleyball), club teams have emerged in place of discontinued sports programs.

Men's former varsity sports 
Crew

 Year discontinued: 1976

Cross Country
 Year discontinued: 1993
NCAA Men's Division I Cross Country Championship team appearances: 3 (1968 • 1970 • 1976)
NCAA Men's Division II Cross Country Championship team national championships: 3 (1965 • 1966 • 1967)
The Aztecs men's cross country team won three consecutive NCAA Division II national championships in 1965, 1966, and 1967 shortly before the program's ascension to Division I.

Gymnastics
 Year discontinued: 1974
NCAA Men's Gymnastics Championships team appearances: 1 (1959)

Swimming & Diving
 Year discontinued: 1985
NCAA Division I Men's Swimming and Diving Championships team appearances: 1 (1969)
NCAA Men's Division II Swimming and Diving Championships team national championships: 2 (1965 • 1966)
Men's swimming & diving won back-to-back NCAA Division II national championships in 1965 and 1966 shortly before the program's transition to Division I.

Track & Field (Indoor and Outdoor)
 Year discontinued: 1992
 NCAA Division I Men's Indoor Track and Field Championships team appearances: 1 (1979)
 NCAA Division I Men's Outdoor Track and Field Championships team appearances: 14 (1965 • 1966 • 1969 • 1970 • 1971 • 1974 • 1976 • 1977 • 1979 • 1980 • 1982 • 1983 • 1984 • 1989)
 NCAA Division II Men's Outdoor Track and Field Championships team national championships: 2 (1965 • 1966)
The men's track & field team won back-to-back NCAA Division II outdoor national championships in 1965 and 1966 shortly before the program's transition to Division I.

Volleyball
 Year discontinued: 2001
 NCAA men's volleyball tournament appearances: 2 (1972 • 1973)
 NCAA men's volleyball tournament National Championship: 1 (1973)

The men's volleyball team won San Diego State's first (and to-date only) NCAA Division I National Championship in 1973. The team's home court was Peterson Gymnasium. 

Water Polo
 Year discontinued: 1978

Despite coming off a season in which the team was ranked in the top 10 nationally, the men's water polo team, along with other programs, was cut, due to a combination of a lack in athletic department funding, Proposition 13's passage, and necessity to comply with Title IX.

Wrestling
 Year discontinued: 1992
 NCAA Division I Wrestling Championships team appearances: 3 (1956 • 1969 • 1992)

In 1949, San Diego State wrestler Harold Hensen became the first African-American to compete in an NCAA wrestling championship tournament when he competed in individual competition at the NCAA Division I Wrestling Championships.

Women's former varsity sports 
Field Hockey
 Year discontinued: 1978
Gymnastics
 Year discontinued: 1985

Rowing 
 Year discontinued: 2021

The women's rowing team, which had last competed in the American Athletic Conference, was discontinued following the 2020–21 academic year due to ongoing Title IX gender equity challenges and financial stress on the athletics department brought on by the COVID-19 pandemic. The team's home was the Mission Bay Aquatic Center.

Athletic facilities

Venues 
{|class="wikitablesortable plainrowheaders" style="font-size:90%;" 
|-
!scope="col"|Facility
! scope="col" |Team(s)
!Opened
|-
| Aztec Aquaplex
| Swimming & diving (women's)

Water polo (women's)
|2007
|-
|Aztec Lacrosse Field
|Lacrosse (women's)
|2011
|-
|Aztec Tennis Center
|Tennis (men's)
Tennis (women's)
|2005
|-
| Peterson Gymnasium
|Volleyball (women's)|1961
|-
|SDSU Softball Stadium|Softball|2005
|-
|SDSU Sports Deck / Aztrack|Soccer (men's)Soccer (women's)Track & field (women's)|2000
|-
| Snapdragon Stadium| Football| 2022
|-
|Tony Gwynn Stadium|Baseball|1997
|-
|Viejas Arena|Basketball (men's)Basketball (women's)|1997
|-
|}

 Other facilities 

Non-varsity club sports

In addition to the varsity sports officially sponsored by the athletic department, San Diego State also supports several club-level sports, most operating through the Aztec Recreation Center. 

Sports with both varsity and club-level teams at the university include baseball and soccer among men's sports, and lacrosse, soccer, volleyball and water polo among women's sports. 

Co-ed club teams

 Cycling
Sailing
 Skiing & Snowboarding
 Surfing
 Tennis
 Triathlon
 Waterskiing & Wakesports

Men's club teams

 Baseball
 Crew
 Ice Hockey
 Lacrosse
 Rugby

 Soccer
 Ultimate Frisbee
 Volleyball
 Water Polo

 Women's club teams 

 Dance
 Lacrosse
 Soccer
 Ultimate Frisbee
 Volleyball
 Water Polo

Championships

NCAA tournament appearances

The San Diego State Aztecs have competed in the NCAA tournament across 16 active sports (6 men's and 10 women's) 191 times at the Division I FBS level.

 Baseball (14): 1979 • 1981 • 1982 • 1983 • 1984 • 1986 • 1990 • 1991 • 2009 • 2013 • 2014 • 2015 • 2017 • 2018
 Men's basketball (14): 1975 • 1976 • 1985 • 2002 • 2006 • 2010 • 2011 • 2012 • 2013 • 2014 • 2015 • 2018 • 2021 • 2022
 Women's basketball (9): 1984 • 1985 • 1993 • 1994 • 1995 • 1997 • 2009 • 2010 • 2012
 Women's cross country (1): 1981
 Football (18): 1947 • 1951 • 1966 • 1967 • 1969 • 1986 • 1991 • 1998 • 2010 • 2011 • 2012 • 2013 • 2014 • 2015 • 2016 • 2017 • 2018 • 2019
 Men's golf (23): 1960 • 1962 • 1965 • 1966 • 1967 • 1970 • 1976 • 1977 • 1978 • 1979 • 1980 • 1981 • 1982 • 1983 • 1984 • 1999 • 2003 • 2005 • 2008 • 2011 • 2012 • 2015 • 2016
 Men's soccer (8): 1969 • 1982 • 1987 • 1988 • 1989 • 2005 • 2006 • 2016
 Women's soccer (7): 1998 • 1999 • 2009 • 2012 • 2013 • 2014 • 2017
 Softball (11): 2001 • 2003 • 2006 • 2008 • 2009 • 2010 • 2011 • 2012 • 2013 • 2014 • 2015
 Women's swimming and diving (8): 1982 • 2010 • 2012 • 2013 • 2014 • 2015 • 2017 • 2019
 Men's tennis (7): 1998 • 1999 • 2000 • 2002 • 2003 • 2005 • 2015
 Women's tennis (22): 1982 • 1983 • 1984 • 1985 • 1986 • 1989 • 1990 • 1991 • 1992 • 1993 • 1996 • 1997 • 1998 • 1999 • 2000 • 2002 • 2003 • 2005 • 2006 • 2007 • 2009 • 2013
 Women's indoor track and field (10): 2006 • 2008 • 2009 • 2010 • 2012 • 2013 • 2014 • 2017 • 2018 • 2019
 Women's outdoor track and field (22): 1982 • 1983 • 1984 • 1985 • 1986 • 1998 • 1999 • 2001 • 2003 • 2004 • 2005 • 2007 • 2008 • 2009 • 2011 • 2012 • 2013 • 2014 • 2016 • 2017 • 2018 • 2019
 Women's volleyball (14): 1981 • 1982 • 1983 • 1984 • 1985 • 1986 • 1988 • 1989 • 1990 • 1994 • 1995 • 1996 • 2001 • 2012
 Women's water polo (3): 2007 • 2008 • 2016

National championships

 Division I championships 
The Aztecs of San Diego State have earned 1 NCAA national championship at the Division I level.

 Men's Volleyball (1): 1973

 Division II championships 
San Diego State won 7 national championships while at the Division II level.

 Men's cross country (3): 1965, 1966, 1967
 Men's track and field (outdoor) (2): 1965, 1966
 Men's swimming and diving (2): 1965, 1966

The Aztecs also claimed 3 national team titles at the varsity level while a member of NCAA Division II that were not bestowed by the NCAA (being awarded instead by sponsors of College Division football polls):

 Football (3): 1966 (both polls), 1967 (both polls), 1968 (coaches' poll) (NCAA College Division)

 NAIA championship 
Basketball (1): 1941 (NAIA)

 Other championships 
SDSU's cheerleading and dance teams have won national championships
 Cheerleading (2): 2009, 2011
 Dance (1): 2011
 
Below are eleven national club team championships:

 Men's badminton (1): 1976 (ABA)
 Flowboarding (1): 2011 (CBS)
 Rugby (1): 1987 (USA Rugby)
 Sailing (2): 1968, 1969 (ICSA)
 Surfing (2): 2007, 2013 (NSSA)
Men's water polo (1): 2017 (CWPA)
Women's water polo (1): 2014 (CWPA)
Waterskiing (2): 1979, 2006 (NCWSA)

Individual Championships

San Diego State has had 15 individuals win NCAA individual national championships at the Division I level.

At the NCAA Division II level, San Diego State garnered 14 individual championships. In 1975 Barbara Barrow won the women's national intercollegiate individual golf championship after a tie-breaker playoff (an event conducted by the AIAW, which was succeeded by the current NCAA women's golf championship).

National Award Winners

Rivals

 BYU 

SDSU athletics has had a formidable rivalry with the BYU Cougars of Brigham Young University since at least the 1980s when both programs were members of the Western Athletic Conference. The rivalry intensified after both schools left the conference to become charter members of the Mountain West Conference in 1999. Through their many years in the same conferences, the Aztecs and Cougars were routinely each-others toughest competition for conference championships in numerous sports among both the men and women. The Cougars departed the Mountain West in 2011, though the programs continue to compete semi-regularly. Men's basketball and football have represented the most high-profile contests of the rivalry.

Fresno State

San Diego State has a longtime rivalry with California State University, Fresno, primarily stemming from the American football rivalry dating back to the 1920s. The two schools have competed against each other in over 55 football, 50 men's basketball, and 190 baseball matches. The two institutions are popular choices and top-tier schools in the California State University system, and often compete for national attention in athletics from conference play to the postseason across many sports.

San Diego

The Aztecs have a local rivalry with the University of San Diego's San Diego Toreros, emphasizing the competition in college men's basketball. The city of San Diego heavily relies on this rivalry, which features many competitions in a neutral location such as Petco Park across many sports. The two schools, approximately separated by 9 miles, have different cultures yet fiercely compete for city visibility. San Diego State's student section, The Show, chants "LITTLE SISTERS!" or "LITTLE BROTHERS!" and "WE RUN SD!" during and after each victory in the college rivalry.

 UC San Diego 

Though more of a rivalry historically outside of sports, the University of California, San Diego (UCSD), the other major public university in San Diego, represents another  local rival of SDSU. The UC San Diego Tritons joined NCAA Division I in 2020. Similar to the way SDSU's student section, The Show, refers to the San Diego Toreros, they often refer to the UC San Diego Tritons as the "little brothers" or "little sisters".

San Jose StateEl Camino Real Rivalry'The rivalry between the two Cal State schools dates back to 1935. The matchup is named after the historic 600-mile Camino Real that connects the 21 Spanish missions in California, stretching from San Diego Bay in the south to San Francisco Bay in the north.

A common storyline in sports, is that of the San Francisco Bay Area vs. Southern California rivalry, such as the Giants and the Dodgers in the MLB, and the Sharks and Kings in the NHL. This SJSU and SDSU rivalry benefits from that sort of bragging rights perspective that both teams undoubtedly look to hold onto each year.  

In 2014, there were conversations between the two programs about creating a trophy using an old mission bell or a replica of an old Spanish mission bell to be awarded to the winner of the rivalry game, but no trophy ever materialized. 

Aztec Hall of Fame inducteesSee: Hall of fame and footnoteThe Show
The Show is the name of the student section at SDSU sporting events.

Band
The San Diego State Marching Aztecs, and Pep and Varsity Bands are often seen at many sporting events including Football, Basketball and even Volleyball.

Notable athletesSee also the List of San Diego State University people''
 Marcelo Balboa, World Cup and Major League Soccer (MLS) soccer star
 Bud Black, former Major League Baseball (MLB) pitcher and manager of the Colorado Rockies
 Jim Campbell, former MLB pitcher
 Joe Corona, current U.S. international soccer player
 Isaac Curtis, former National Football League (NFL) receiver
 Jeff DaVanon, former MLB player (Arizona Diamondbacks)
 Fred Dryer, actor-producer and former NFL player
 Herm Edwards, Arizona State University head coach
 Marshall Faulk, Pro Football Hall of Fame NFL running back and broadcaster
 John Fox, former Carolina Panthers, Chicago Bears, and Denver Broncos head coach
 Mark Grace, retired MLB player and World Series Champion
 Tony Gwynn, Baseball Hall of Famer (and San Diego State baseball Head Coach at the time of his death in 2014)
 Kabeer Gbaja-Biamila, former NFL player with the Green Bay Packers
 Joe Gibbs, former NFL head coach of the Washington Redskins and current NASCAR team owner
 Az-Zahir Hakim, former NFL wide receiver
 Kameron Kelly, defensive back for the Pittsburgh Steelers
 Armen Keteyian, Sports Journalist, HBO Sports, Real Sports with Bryant Gumbel
 Travis Lee, former MLB player
 Kawhi Leonard, NBA Small Forward for the Los Angeles Clippers, 2014 and 2019 NBA Finals MVP, 2015 and 2016 NBA Defensive Player of the Year
 Art Linkletter, SDSU basketball player and swimmer who went on to a decades-long career as a radio and TV personality
 Chris Marlowe, Sportscaster, former Olympic volleyball player
 Kirk Morrison, former NFL linebacker with Buffalo Bills
 Haven Moses, former NFL receiver, 2x Pro Bowler
 Kassim Osgood, former NFL receiver
 Rashaad Penny, running back for the Seattle Seahawks
 Noel Prefontaine, former Canadian Football League kicker
 Donnel Pumphrey, former NFL running back
 Jimmy Raye, former NFL player
 Darnay Scott, former Cincinnati Bengals wide receiver
 Don Shaw, former MLB pitcher
 Brian Sipe, former NFL quarterback
 Webster Slaughter, former American football wide receiver
 Dave Smith, former MLB pitcher
 Stephen Strasburg, MLB pitcher for the Washington Nationals
 Carl Weathers, actor/former NFL player most famous for playing Apollo Creed in the Rocky film series
 Eric Wynalda, former World Cup and MLS soccer star, former ABC Sports broadcaster, current head coach of Las Vegas Lights FC
 Jeanne Zelasko, Sports Journalist, Fox Sports

Footnotes

References

External links